Stadio comunale San Vito "Gigi Marulla" is a multi-purpose stadium, in Cosenza, Italy. The stadium has a capacity of 24,209. It is currently used mostly for football matches and it is the home ground of Cosenza Calcio from 1914.

Sting performed at the stadium during his Ten Summoner's Tales Tour on July 17, 1993.

Bob Dylan concluded his 2006 European Tour at the stadium on July 20, 2006.

In 2015 the stadium was entitled to Luigi Marulla, former Cosenza Calcio player and coach.

References

San Vito
Stadio San Vito
Sports venues in Calabria
Buildings and structures in the Province of Cosenza